The Samson Switchblade is an American amateur-built roadable aircraft, under development by Samson Motorworks of Meadow Vista, California. It was publicly introduced at AirVenture in 2009 in mock-up form. The aircraft is intended to be supplied as a kit for amateur construction initially and possibly as a complete ready-to-fly-aircraft in the future.

The design effort is being led by Samson CEO Sam Bousfield, assisted by aeronautical design firm DAR Corp of Lawrence, Kansas. First flight of the full-sized aircraft was originally forecast in 2009 for 2010, but by July 2012 only a 1/4 scale model had been flown. In February 2014 the design had passed through the final round of wind tunnel testing, and in March 2014 the first carbon fiber parts were made for the conforming flying prototype.

By February 2016 the carbon fiber wings and folding mechanism had been prototyped.

In February 2018 the company indicated it intended to fly a prototype before year end. That goal was not met and in July 2019 the company indicated it was still working towards a first flight.

Design and development
The Switchblade will be a three-wheeled motorcycle type vehicle with forward retracting wings. Early designs included a canard surface.

The aircraft is made from composites and its fuselage shape was inspired by Ferrari automotive designs. For ground use the wings fold forward under the aircraft's belly into a clamshell case that protects them from road debris. There is an impact absorbing steel structural keel. Due to differing angle of incidence requirements and the large rear road wheels, the nose will be raised 4° for take-off, eliminating the need to rotate the vehicle in aircraft mode.

Initial production is focusing on development of a kit version for amateur construction, with factory builder assistance if desired. The company has indicated that a ready-to-fly light-sport aircraft model or a type certified model may be developed in the future.

The vehicle will require a motorcycle or automobile driver's license to operate on the ground and a minimum of a private pilot license to fly.

By July 2018 the company was redesigning the tail in preparation for a first flight by year end and claimed 667 orders for the design.

In July 2019 the company was still working towards a first flight and AVweb described the project as "One of the longest in-development flying car projects" and noted that the manufacturer "is still at it", after ten years in development.

Specifications (projected performance)

References

External links

Homebuilt aircraft
Single-engined pusher aircraft
Roadable aircraft
Ducted fan-powered aircraft
Proposed aircraft of the United States